The 1975 season was the 70th season of competitive football in Norway.

Men's football

League season

Promotion and relegation

1. divisjon

Viking FK won the championship, their fifth league title.

2. divisjon

Group A

Group B

District IX–X

District XI

3. divisjon

Norwegian Cup

Final

Source:

UEFA competitions

European Cup

First round

|}

European Cup Winners' Cup

First round

|}

UEFA Cup

First round

|}

National team

Results 
Source:

References

 
Seasons in Norwegian football